Htun Htun (Examplez) (born Htin Aung Htun on 24 December 1983) is a Burmese actor and singer. He is best known for his leading roles in several Burmese films. Throughout his career, he has acted as leading actor in over 100 films and 40 Big screen movies.

Early life and education
Htun Htun was born on 24 December 1983 in Yangon, Myanmar. His grandfather Ant Gyi was a prominent Burmese musician. He graduated with a degree B.A (English) from Dagon University.

Career
He started his career in 2001. Four music solo album of Examplez Boy Band Group had been releasing since 2001. Then he worked as composer, singer and music producer. He worked as model in TV commercial, poster, wall-sheets, calendars and magazines, etc. He established his movie industry in 2002.

Since 2007, he has been acting with the Htawara Hninzi (Eternal Rose) Burmese traditional dance group, in which he is one of the comedians, alongside Nay Toe, Moe Moe, Ye Lay and Kyaw Kyaw Bo.
He acted as leading actor in over 100 films and 40 Big screen movies. He won the Best Actor Award in Myanmar Motion Picture Academy Awards 2016 for Oak Kyar Myet Pauk film.

Discography

Superstar

Filmography

Film (Cinema)
Kaba Sone Hti (2005)
Chit San Eain 2028 (2015)
Oak Kyar Myet Pauk (2016)
Kyauk Kyauk Kyauk (2017)
Khoe Soe Lu Hnite (2017)
Thar Pike Kaung (2018)
Bridge of Clouds (2018)
Mhaw Kyauk Sar (2018)
My Rowdy Angel (2018)
Kyar Tot The Lal Maung Sakar (2019)
Box No. 88 (2019)
Responsible Citizen (2019)
Lay Par Kyawt Shein Warazain (2019)
Journey to the Death (2019)
Pa Pa Wadi See Yin Khan (2019)
Players (2020)

Television series
Shwe Moe Ngwe Moe Thoon Phyo Lo Ywar (2016)

Awards

References

External links

Living people
1983 births
21st-century Burmese male singers
21st-century Burmese male actors
People from Yangon